Cortina may refer to:

Things
 Cortina (tango), a short piece of music played during a tango dance event
 Ford Cortina, a medium-sized family car built by Ford of Britain from 1962 to 1982
Lotus Cortina, a 1963–1968 performance variant on the above
 Cortina (mycology), a cobweb-like partial veil on certain types of mushroom (which gives name to the genus Cortinarius)
 , a Panamanian passenger ship in service 1996-97

Places
 Cortina d'Ampezzo, a town in the province of Belluno, northern Italy
 Cortina sulla strada del vino, Italian name of Kurtinig an der Weinstraße, a town in South Tyrol, northern Italy
 Cortina Elementary School, in Queen Creek, Arizona
 Cortina Indian Rancheria, California, a Native American reservation in Colusa county, California

People
 Adela Cortina, Spanish philosopher
 Alfonso Cortina (1944–2020), Spanish businessman
 Jon Cortina (1934–2005), Spanish Jesuit priest
 Juan Cortina (1824–1894), Mexican rancher, politician, military leader, outlaw and folk hero
Cortina Troubles (1859-1861), in which paramilitary forces led by Juan Cortina engaged various regular and militia forces

Companies
 Cortina Cycles, a U.S. manufacturer of mountain bike frames based in Santa Barbara, California
 Cortina Systems, a fabless semiconductor company headquartered in Sunnyvale, California

Spanish-language surnames
Italian-language surnames